Robert Worsley (died 1402), of Booths in Worsley, Lancashire, was an English politician.

He was a Member (MP) of the Parliament of England for Lancashire in 1386 and 1391.

References

14th-century births
1402 deaths
English MPs 1386
Members of the Parliament of England (pre-1707) for Lancashire
English MPs 1391